Nurhak is a town and district of Kahramanmaraş Province in the Mediterranean region of Turkey. The district has a population of 12,323 as of 2021.

Composition 
The district is populated by Kurds and Turks.

References

External links
 District governor's official website 

Populated places in Kahramanmaraş Province
Districts of Kahramanmaraş Province
Towns in Turkey

Kurdish settlements in Turkey